Platanthera aquilonis, the northern green orchid or north wind bog orchid, is a species of orchid native to the United States and Canada.

It is closely related to Platanthera huronensis and Platanthera dilatata and had long been confused with Platanthera hyperborea until it was described as a separate species in 1999.

References

External links 
 

aquilonis